The 1958 United States Senate election in California was held on November 4, 1958. 

Incumbent senator William F. Knowland opted not to run for re-election, choosing instead to run for election as governor. Incumbent governor Goodwin Knight exchanged places with Knowland and lost to U.S. Representative Clair Engle in the midst of a national landslide for the Democratic Party. 

This was one of ten seats Democrats gained from the Republican Party in 1958, part of a record swing (including the elections of new Senators from Alaska and Hawaii).

Republican primary

Candidates
 George Christopher, Mayor of San Francisco
 William Jolley
 Goodwin Knight, Governor of California
 Alexander Williamson

Results

Democratic primary

Candidates
 Clair Engle, U.S. Representative from Red Bluff
 Fritjof Thygeson

Results

General election

Results

See also 
 1958 United States Senate elections

References 

1958
California
United States Senate